The 2019 Rugby League World Cup 9s was the first staging of the Rugby League World Cup 9s tournament and took place on 18 and 19 October 2019  at Sydney's Bankwest Stadium. The tournament featured teams from 12 International Rugby League member countries, 4 of which also fielded teams in the women's tournament. In the men's final, Australia defeated New Zealand, while in the women's final, New Zealand defeated Australia.

Rule variations 
The standard rules of rugby league applied but with the following variations:
 games are nine-a-side with unlimited interchanges in the 13-strong squad
 each half is nine minutes with a 2-minute half time
 the tackle count for the team in possession is five rather than six
 any player sin-binned is off the field for only three minutes
 the 40/20 rule is supplemented by a 20/40 rule i.e. a kick from behind the player's own 20m line which after bouncing goes into touch past the opponent's 40m line will result in the kicking team retaining possession with a tap-restart
 Bonus zone tries - tries score four points as normal but the value of the try will be increased to five for a try scored in the area between the goalposts
 all conversions are drop kicks rather than place kicks and a 25-second shot clock will apply
 a game which goes to extra time will be decided by golden try extra time

Teams

The competing teams were hand picked, and the selections were announced on 22 April 2019.

On 27 September 2019, the Tonga National Rugby League were suspended by the International Rugby League (IRL), pending an investigation into their board. Tonga were represented at the tournament by a "Tonga Invitatonal" team.

Men's

Women's

Match Officials 
The NRL named the following 18 NRL match officials to handle the 28 matches.
  Grant Atkins
  Tyson Brough
  Matt Cecchin
  Ben Cummins
  Darian Furner
  Adam Gee
  Peter Gough
  Phil Henderson
  Ziggy Przeklasa-Adamski
  Belinda Sharpe
  Todd Smith
  Jon Stone
  Chris Sutton
  Gerard Sutton
  Chris Kendall
  Stephane Vincent
  Henry Perenara
  Paki Parkinson

Venue

Men's tournament

Pool stage
The pools were announced on 22 July 2019. The draw was announced on 4 August 2019.

Pool A

Pool B

Lebanon were stripped of their win over France due to fielding an ineligible player.

Pool C

Knockout stage

Semi-finals

New Zealand vs England

Australia vs Samoa

Final: Australia v New Zealand

Women's tournament

Pool stage
The draw was announced on 4 August 2019.

Final: Australia v New Zealand

Try scorers

Men's
7
 Jamayne Isaako

5
 Ken Maumalo

4

 Josh Addo-Carr
 Kyle Feldt
 Mitchell Moses

3

 Robert Jennings
 Sione Katoa
 Bilal Maarbani
 Marion Seve
 Reimis Smith
 Maika Tudravu

2

 Dean Blore
 AJ Brimson
 Nathan Brown
 Mike Butt
 Jake Connor
 David Fifita
 Edene Gebbie
 Anthony Gelling
 Campbell Graham
 Ash Handley
 Kayal Iro
 Shaun Johnson
 Elliot Kear
 Moses Leota
 Danny Levi
 Gavin Marguerite
 Jermaine McGillvary
 Travis Robinson
 Bailey Simonsson
 Sam Tomkins
 Brian To'o

1

 Stargroth Amean
 Tevin Arona
 Jai Arrow
 Blake Austin
 Lambert Belmas
 Watson Boas
 Ryan Burroughs
 Daly Cherry-Evans
 Daryl Clark
 Alrix Da Costa
 William Fakatoumafi
 Bureta Faraimo
 Kristian Freed
 Tyson Frizell
 Regan Grace
 Clinton Gutherson
 Ryan Hall
 Tim Lafai
 Thomas Lasvenes
 Joseva Lawalawa
 Kyle Laybutt
 Penaia Leveleve
 Garry Lo
 Jarome Luai
 Paul Marcon
 Jeremy Marshall-King
 Steven Marsters
 Kevin Naiqama
 Tesi Niu
 David Nofoaluma
 Justin Olam
 Tevita Pangai Junior
 Ryan Papenhuyzen
 Kalyn Ponga
 John Puna
 Nixon Putt
 Selestino Ravutaumada
 Reubenn Rennie
 Reece Robinson
 Arthur Romano
 Dan Russell
 Ligi Sao
 Maika Sivo
 Ryan Sutton
 Brody Tamarua
 Charbel Tasipale
 Aaron Teroi
 Junior Vaivai
 Malakai Watene-Zelezniak
 Lloyd White
 Elliott Whitehead
 Gareth Widdop

Women's
5
 Tiana Penitani

4
 Honey Hireme
 Corban McGregor

3
 Jules Newman

2

 Ali Brigginshaw
 Isabelle Kelly
 Rhiannon Marshall
 Nita Maynard
 Raecene McGregor
 Ua Ravu
 Krystal Rota
 Kiana Takairangi
 Shakiah Tungai

1

 Elsie Albert
 Kezie Apps
 Caitlin Beevers
 Leah Burke
 Keeley Davis
 Amy Hardcastle
 Janet Johns
 Kanyon Paul
 Julia Robinson
 Emily Rudge
 Jessica Sergis
 Hannah Southwell
 Atawhai Tupaea
 Georgia Wilson

Controversy
On 19 October 2019, Lebanon's Jacob Kiraz and Jordan Samrani and Papua New Guinea women's players Sera Koroi and Joyce Waula were all suspended from the tournament for being under the age of 18. 

While the International Rugby League allows players 16 or older to play in Test matches, the National Rugby League (who ran the tournament) rules require that players must be 18 or older. 

Kiraz, who would not turn 18 until November 2019, was the only one of the four to play a game, coming off the bench in Lebanon's 12–8 win over France. Lebanon were stripped of the two competition points earned for their win as a result.

Media coverage

References

2019 in Australian rugby league
Rugby League World Cup 9s
Rugby league in Sydney
Sports competitions in Sydney
International rugby league competitions hosted by Australia
Rugby league nines
Rugby League World Cup 9s